Timeline of the COVID-19 pandemic in Singapore may refer to:

 Timeline of the COVID-19 pandemic in Singapore (2020)
 Timeline of the COVID-19 pandemic in Singapore (2021)
 Timeline of the COVID-19 pandemic in Singapore (2022)
Timeline of the COVID-19 pandemic in Singapore (2023)

Singapore